Francis A. Gregory Neighborhood Library is part of the District of Columbia Public Library (DCPL) System. It was originally opened to the public in 1961. A new building on the same site, designed by award-winning architect David Adjaye opened on June 19, 2012.

History 

The original Francis A. Gregory Library was built in 1961 as the fifth of eleven branch libraries funded under a public works program for the District of Columbia. The original building was designed by architect Victor DeMers. Originally named the Fort Davis Branch, the library opened in January 1961 on former parkland (Fort Davis Park) that was transferred to the District from the National Capital Planning Commission. In 1986, the library was named for Francis A. Gregory, a local public servant who had been the first black president of the DC Public Library Board of Trustees.

The new Francis A. Gregory Library was described in Architectural Record as a “shimmering pavilion.” The building is a two-story, glass-sheathed box with an aluminum roof that juts out over every side. It cost $11 million to construct and is a LEED Gold-certified building.

See also
 District of Columbia Public Library
 Fort Davis (Washington, D.C.)

References

External links
DC Public Library Francis A. Gregory Neighborhood Library page

Library buildings completed in 1961
Library buildings completed in 2012
Public libraries in Washington, D.C.